Akhmed Kairovich Kurbanov (born 22 April 1986) is a former Russian professional football player.

Club career
He made his Russian Football National League debut for FC Anzhi Makhachkala on 1 November 2003 in a game against PFC Spartak Nalchik. He also played for Anzhi in the FNL in the following season.

External links
 
 

1986 births
Footballers from Makhachkala
Russian people of Dagestani descent
Living people
Russian footballers
Association football midfielders
FC Anzhi Makhachkala players
FC Tekstilshchik Kamyshin players
FC Arsenal Tula players
FC Mashuk-KMV Pyatigorsk players